Morgan James Ferrier (born 15 November 1994) is an English professional footballer who plays for  Nakhon Ratchasima as a striker.

Club career
Born in Plaistow, Newham, Ferrier played youth football with Arsenal, Watford and Nottingham Forest. In January 2013 he was sent out to Southern League Premier Division side Kettering Town on a three-month loan. After leaving Nottingham Forest he briefly went on trial with Bolton Wanderers.

He played briefly for Cray Wanderers in the Isthmian League Premier Division in 2013–14. He then joined Crystal Palace, and spent time with Bishop's Stortford and Hemel Hempstead Town before signing for Boreham Wood in August 2016. He was put up for sale in May 2017, and spent time with Dagenham & Redbridge before returning to Boreham Wood in February 2018. Boreham Wood later accused Ferrier's agent of "bullying".

He signed for Walsall in August 2018.

He moved to Tranmere Rovers on 1 August 2019 for an undisclosed transfer fee. In August 2019 he suffered a knee ligament injury and would be on the sidelines for 8 weeks.

On 11 February 2021, Ferrier joined Israeli Premier League side Maccabi Petah Tikva for an undisclosed fee.

On 24 June 2021 he signed for Ironi Kiryat Shmona.

In August 2022, Ferrier announced on his Instagram account that he had joined Thai League 1 side Nakhon Ratchasima.

International career
He has played for England C.

Career statistics

References

1994 births
Living people
Footballers from Plaistow, Newham
English footballers
Arsenal F.C. players
Crystal Palace F.C. players
Nottingham Forest F.C. players
Kettering Town F.C. players
Cray Wanderers F.C. players
Bishop's Stortford F.C. players
Hemel Hempstead Town F.C. players
Boreham Wood F.C. players
Dagenham & Redbridge F.C. players
Walsall F.C. players
Tranmere Rovers F.C. players
Maccabi Petah Tikva F.C. players
Hapoel Ironi Kiryat Shmona F.C. players
English Football League players
National League (English football) players
Southern Football League players
Israeli Premier League players
Association football forwards
English expatriate footballers
Expatriate footballers in Israel
English expatriate sportspeople in Israel
Expatriate footballers in Thailand
English expatriate sportspeople in Thailand
Morgan Ferrier